Mid-South Management Company Inc. was a family-owned, Spartanburg, South Carolina-based publisher of small to medium market newspapers in North Carolina, South Carolina, Virginia  and Georgia. The company was started in 1948 by Phil Buchheit, who was then publisher and operator of the Spartanburg Herald-Journal.

Daily newspapers
The LaGrange Daily News, LaGrange, Georgia
The Mount Airy News, Mount Airy, North Carolina
The Laurinburg Exchange, Laurinburg, North Carolina
The Union Daily Times, Union, South Carolina

Non-dailies
The Newberry Observer, Newberry, South Carolina
The Pickens Sentinel,  Pickens, South Carolina
Easley Progress, Easley, South Carolina
The Stokes News, Stokes County, North Carolina
The Jefferson Post, West Jefferson, North Carolina
Rural Hall Weekly Independent, Rural Hall, North Carolina
The Tribune, Elkin, North Carolina 
The Yadkin Ripple, Yadkinville, North Carolina
The Pilot, Pilot Mountain, North Carolina
The Carroll News, Carroll County, Virginia
The Thomaston Times, Thomaston, Georgia

Recent changes
In 2005, Mid-South sold the Williamson Daily News, Williamson, West Virginia, and two affiliated weeklies to Heartland Publications.

In 2006, The Phenix Citizen, Phenix City, Alabama, was sold to Family Media Inc.

In June 2007, the remainder of the assets were sold to Heartland Publications, LLC, a Connecticut based publisher.

References

Publishing companies established in 1948
Companies based in South Carolina
Spartanburg, South Carolina
Newspaper companies of the United States
Companies based in Spartanburg, South Carolina